Pinning may refer to:

 Pinning, the effect of certain weapons that cause their targets to be pinned down
 Pinning ceremony (nursing), a symbolic welcoming of new graduates into the nursing profession
 Pinning force, a force acting on a pinned object from a pinning center
 Pinning (modelling), the use of pins to strengthen the joins when assembling large or heavy model kits
 Pinning points, points in a crystalline material that act to halt a dislocation's movement
 Pinning hold, a hold used to control an opponent in grappling
 Flux pinning, a phenomenon that magnetic flux lines do not move despite the Lorentz force acting on them inside a current-carrying Type II superconductor
 Percutaneous pinning, a technique used by orthopedic surgeons for the stabilisation of unstable fractures
 Tree pinning, inserting spikes into trees in order to cause damage to sawmill equipment
 Zener pinning, the influence of a dispersion of fine particles on the movement of low- and high angle grain boundaries through a polycrystalline material
 HTTP Public Key Pinning, a security mechanism for HTTPS websites

See also
 Pin (disambiguation)
 Panning (disambiguation)
 Pegging (disambiguation)